The Island Hopper is an airline route between Guam and Honolulu, Hawaii, via several small islands in the Federated States of Micronesia and the Marshall Islands. The route, currently operated by United and originally by Continental Micronesia, is the only scheduled service for many of the islands visited en route.

History
The Island Hopper route was launched in 1968 as Air Micronesia, when Continental Airlines CEO Robert F. Six believed that operating in this area could be profitable despite its remoteness. It initially operated as Continental Micronesia Flight 957 up to six days a week. At one point, the route was flown by Boeing 727s and had seven stops, one more than the current route. Between June 18, 1969 and 1970, the route also stopped at Johnston Atoll. This stop was discontinued when plans were made to ship and store chemical munitions on the atoll. The aircraft used in this service were equipped with special tires and a unique coating on the belly of the aircraft to protect the fuselage from flying rocks on the runway. They were also fitted with more powerful engines to improve takeoff performance.

In April 1998, the route was reduced to twice weekly, on Mondays and Fridays, and dropped Wednesdays service. By October 1999, the airline restored Wednesday flights but this flight skipped Chuuk for about 6 months due to the airport's runway construction. In 2011, the Island Hopper left Guam on Mondays and Fridays at 9:30 am and arrived at Honolulu at 4:00 am. Wednesday flights departed Guam at 10:30 am, bypassed Kosrae, and arrived at Honolulu also at 4:00 am. On the return trip, the flights left Honolulu on Mondays, Wednesdays and Fridays at 5:50 am. Monday and Friday flights arrived in Guam on Tuesdays and Saturdays at 4:26 pm while Wednesday flights arrived in Guam on Thursday at 3:06 pm as they skipped Kosrae.

The Island Hopper route was a major contributor to the financial success of Continental Airlines' Micronesia unit in 1995. Round-trip airfare between Honolulu and Guam costs US$960 and one-stop island hop costs US$225 roundtrip in 1996. In 2008, the route accounted for 30% of Continental Micronesia's business. During the COVID-19 pandemic, service was reduced to around one flight monthly carrying cargo due to travel bans on islands on the route.

In 2012 Continental merged into United, who continued flying this route.

Current route

The flight operates three times weekly as United Flight 155 from Guam to Honolulu, and Flight 154 from Honolulu to Guam. Unlike other flights, a mechanic and extra set of spare parts is carried on board the Boeing 737-800. Other peculiarities include having four pilots working on each flight. Two pilots would fly the leg from Honolulu to Majuro and the other pair fly the remaining legs. Flight attendants also receive crew duty time exemption from Federal Aviation Administration (FAA). Since many runways in the islands are short, fire trucks are usually staffed and lined up beside the runway ready to cool the brakes and tires after each landing. The front rows of Economy class can be collapsed to accommodate stretchers in case of medevac.

From east to west, the airports served are:

Note that Kwajalein Atolls is currently an active military base owned by the US Military. As a result passengers are prohibited from leaving the aircraft unless they have permission from the US Government. Passengers are also prohibited from taking photos/videos of the island. 

The total time from Honolulu to Guam, including time on the ground, is 16 hours. It takes 4.5 hours to fly from Honolulu to Majuro, followed by a 45-minute flight from Majuro to Kwajalein. From Kwajalein to Kosrae, the flight takes one hour. Kosrae to Pohnpei flight takes another hour. From Pohnpei, it takes 70 minutes to fly to Chuuk. The final leg, from Chuuk to Guam, takes 90 minutes. Passengers may disembark and reboard at each stop or remain on the aircraft. Ground times at each stop are 45 minutes at Majuro, 39 minutes at Kwajalein, 33 minutes at Kosrae, 34 minutes at Pohnpei and 34 minutes at Chuuk. Upon arrival in Guam it is possible connect to United Airlines "Manila Hopper" flight which flies to Manila, Philippines with similar brief stops in Koror, Palau.

References

Airline routes
United Airlines